Jamie Thompson is a Canadian musician.

Jamie Thompson also may refer to:
Jamie Thompson (cricketer) (b. 1991), English cricketer 
Jamie Thompson (footballer) (1892–1975), Australian rules footballer

See also
Jamie Thomson (disambiguation)
James Thompson (disambiguation)